The 1988 winners of the Torneo di Viareggio (in English, the Viareggio Tournament, officially the Viareggio Cup World Football Tournament Coppa Carnevale), the annual youth football tournament held in Viareggio, Tuscany, are listed below.

Format
The 16 teams are seeded in 4 groups. Each team from a group meets the others in a single tie. The winner of each group progress to the final knockout stage.

Participating teams

Italian teams

  Fiorentina
  Genoa
  Inter Milan
  Milan
  Napoli
  Parma
  Roma
  Torino

European teams

  Rangers
  Dukla Prague
  Porto
  VfB Stuttgart
  Partizan
  Steaua București
  Espanyol

American teams
  Mexico City

Group stage

Group A

Group B

Group C

Group D

Knockout stage

Champions

Footnotes

External links
 Official Site (Italian)
 Results on RSSSF.com

1988
1987–88 in Italian football
1987–88 in German football
1987–88 in Yugoslav football
1987–88 in Czechoslovak football
1987–88 in Romanian football
1987–88 in Spanish football
1987–88 in Portuguese football
1987–88 in Scottish football
1986–87 in Mexican football